Robert de Stanley was a Priest in the Roman Catholic Church.

Career
Resigned as vicar of Aylesbury in 1348.

References
 

Year of birth missing
Year of death missing
14th-century English Roman Catholic priests